The gens Caecia was a Roman family during the late Republic.  It does not seem to have been particularly large or important.  Its best-known member was Gaius Caecius, a friend of the younger Publius Cornelius Lentulus Spinther, spoken of by Cicero in 49 BC.

See also
 List of Roman gentes

References

Roman gentes